My Love Story is an Odia film released on 1 March 2013. Riya Sen appears in an item song.

Cast
 Deepak Panda
 Katrina Kovi
 Mihir Das
 Riya Sen as an item number

Soundtrack
The music was composed by Gagan Bihari and released by Anhad Studio.

References

2010s Odia-language films
Films set in Odisha